Bisluke Kipkorir Kiplagat (born 8 August 1988) is a Kenyan middle-distance runner who specializes in the 3000 metres steeplechase.

Achievements

Personal bests
1500 metres - 3:38.19 min (2006)
3000 metres - 7:44.62 min (2007)
3000 metres steeplechase - 8:18.11 min (2006)

External links

1988 births
Living people
Kenyan male middle-distance runners
Kenyan male steeplechase runners